XLCubed (XLCubed Ltd) is a business intelligence software and consulting services company. Established in 2001, XLCubed develops business intelligence software (for Microsoft Excel and Web-based reporting) and provides business intelligence and performance management consulting services. The company is privately held and based out of the United Kingdom in the Thames Valley IT corridor.

XLCubed is partnered with Inform Information Systems for Oil and Gas and Energy systems implementation and maintains a number of partnerships for specific market sectors and geographic regions. These include Tagetik in Business performance management and SCIO Health Analytics in the Pharmaceutical industry. With its partners, XLCubed provides services to such companies as BP and Bristol-Myers Squibb.

Focused around the Microsoft BI stack and in-memory OLAP technology, since 2007 XLCubed has expanded its remit to become a leading vendor of data visualization technologies and expertise, being named as one of CIO Review's 100 most promising Microsoft Solution providers in 2015. XLCubed is a Microsoft Gold Partner.

XLCubed software is used by business end users to create dynamic reports, dashboards, and planning solutions which are then deployed either via Microsoft Excel or the Web. XLCubed supports Microsoft Excel editions from Excel 2003 to Excel 2016 for querying SQL Server Analysis Services 2000 to 2016 (both multidimensional cubes and tabular models), PowerOLAP, and relational data sources including SQL Server and Oracle. XLCubed and similar tools aim to address many of the issues businesses experience with the proliferation of spreadsheets as data stores, or spreadmarts.

After the demise of Microsoft Performance Point Planning in early 2009, XLCubed developed the XLCubed PM suite. The XLCubed PM suite uses either Analysis Services or the PowerOLAP in-memory OLAP engine to enable real-time write back and instant results without the need for batch calculations.

History
 2001 – XLCubed v1 – Formula Based OLAP reporting in Excel
 2002 – XLCubed Explorer – Grid based Slice and dice Analytics
 2003 – XLCubed v2 for Excel combining the Formula & Grid modes
 2004 – XLCubed Web Edition
 2005 – XLCubed v3
 2007 – XLCubed v4 – MicroChart Integration, fully redesigned Web Edition
 2008 – XLCubed v5 – extended feature set, relational support
 2009 – XLCubed PM Launched at TDWI, Orlando. Modelling capabilities, PowerOLAP integration
 2010 – XLCubed v6 
 May 2012 – XLCubed v7 – support for SQL Server 2012's BI Semantic Model, and much improved relational reporting
 September 2012 – XLCubed v7.1 – Treemap and Lollipop visualisations, support for Windows 8 and Microsoft Office 2013, and ProClarity report conversion 
 December 2012 - XLCubed v7.2 - various minor improvements 
 July 2013 - XLCubed v7.5 - new ad hoc mode for Web Edition, IPhone, Android and Windows Phone support, PowerPivot support, interactive charting
 November 2013 - XLCubed v7.6 - custom drilldown (Flex reporting), improved SharePoint integration 
 September 2014 - XLCubed v8 - Updated interface, centralised SQL repository, improved SharePoint integration, Open Data Protocol (OData) support 
 July 2015 - XLCubed v8.1 - Viewports, comments and SAP HANA support

References

External links
 Official site
 XLCubed Consulting

Online analytical processing
Business intelligence companies
Companies based in Maidenhead
Software companies established in 2001
Software companies of the United Kingdom